Wyatt is a patronymic surname, derived from the Norman surname Guyot, derived from "widu", Proto-Germanic for "wood".

Notable people with the surname "Wyatt" include

A
Aaron Wyatt, Australian musician
Addie L. Wyatt (1924–2012), American labor leader
Adrian Wyatt, British physicist
Alan Wyatt (born 1935), Australian cricketer
Albert Wyatt (1886–??), British runner
Alex Wyatt (born 1990), English cricketer
Alex Wyatt (cricketer, born 1976) (born 1976), Australian cricketer
Alvin Wyatt (born 1947), American football player
Andrew Wyatt, American musician
Annie Forsyth Wyatt (1885–1961), Australian conservationist
Antwuan Wyatt (born 1975), American football player
Arthur Guy Norris Wyatt (1893-1982), Royal Navy Officer and Hydrographer
Arthur Wyatt (born 1975), British writer
Arthur Wyatt (diplomat) (1929–2015), British diplomat
Avis Wyatt (born 1984), American basketball player

B
B. Wyatt, American actor
Barbara Wyatt (1930–2012), British figure skater
Benjamin Wyatt (disambiguation), multiple people
Bill Wyatt (born 1938), Australian basketball player
Bob Wyatt (1901–1995), English cricketer
Bobby Wyatt (born 1992), American golfer
Bowden Wyatt (1917–1969), American football player
Bray Wyatt (born 1987), American professional wrestler

C
Caleb Wyatt (born 1976), American stunt performer
Candice Wyatt (born 1982), Australian journalist
Carol Wyatt (born 1946), British artist
Caroline Wyatt (born 1967), British journalist
Cedric Wyatt (1940–2014), Australian public servant
Charles Wyatt (disambiguation), multiple people
Chris Wyatt (disambiguation), multiple people
Clarrie Wyatt (1904–1986), Australian rules footballer
Colin Wyatt (born 1939), American illustrator
Colin Wyatt (musician), American drummer

D
Danni Wyatt (born 1991), English cricketer
Dave Wyatt (1871–1950), American baseball player
David Wyatt (disambiguation), multiple people
Derek Wyatt (born 1949), British politician
Derrick Wyatt (born 1948), English legal scholar
Devonte Wyatt (born 1998), American football player
Dorothy Wyatt (1925–2011), Canadian politician
Doug Wyatt (born 1946), American football player

E
Ed Wyatt (born 1960), Australian broadcaster
Edith Franklin Wyatt (1873–1958), American writer
Eliza Wyatt, American playwright
Erin Wyatt, American model

F
Finnlay Wyatt (born 1995), English footballer
F. Mark Wyatt (1920–2006), American intelligence officer
Francis Wyatt (1588–1644), English colonial administrator
Francis Wyatt (cricketer) (1882–1971), English cricketer
Frank Wyatt (1852–1926), English actor
Frank Wyatt (sport shooter) (born 1946), British sport shooter

G
Gail E. Wyatt (born 1944), American psychologist
Gareth Wyatt (born 1977), Welsh rugby union footballer
George Wyatt (disambiguation), multiple people
Gerald Wyatt (1933–2001), English cricketer
Gerard R. Wyatt (1925–2019), American-Canadian biochemist
Greg Wyatt, American sculptor

H
Halifax Wyatt (1829–1909), English cricketer
Harold Wyatt (1880–1949), English cricketer
Harry M. Wyatt III (born 1949), American lieutenant general
Henry Wyatt (disambiguation), multiple people
Honor Wyatt (1910–1998), English journalist
Hugh Wyatt (born 1933), English politician

I
Inzer Bass Wyatt (1907–1990), American judge
Ivan Wyatt (1924–2009), New Zealand cricketer

J
James Wyatt (disambiguation), multiple people
Jane Wyatt (1910–2006), American actress
J. Edward Wyatt (1860–1932), Canadian politician
Jennifer Wyatt (born 1965), Canadian golfer
Jessee Wyatt (born 1996), Australian Paralympic athlete
Jo Wyatt, English actress
Joe Wyatt (1900–1970), American baseball player
Joe B. Wyatt, American academic administrator
John Wyatt (disambiguation), multiple people
Jon Wyatt (born 1973), British field hockey player
Jonathan Wyatt (born 1972), New Zealand runner
Joseph Wyatt (disambiguation), multiple people
Julian Wyatt (born 1963), English cricketer
Justin Wyatt (born 1984), American football player

K
Kandi Wyatt (born 1991), Canadian boxer
Keith Wyatt, American guitarist
Keke Wyatt (born 1982), American singer
Ken Wyatt (born 1952), Australian politician
Kervin Wyatt (born 1957), American football player
Kevin Wyatt (born 1964), American football player
Khalif Wyatt (born 1991), American basketball player
Kimberly Wyatt (born 1982), American singer
Kirsten Wyatt (born 1975), American actress

L
Len Wyatt (1919–2015), New Zealand cricketer
Lewis Wyatt (1777–1853), British architect
Lisa K. Wyatt, American actress
Logan Wyatt (born 1997), American baseball player
Lucius R. Wyatt (born 1938), American trumpeter
Lucy R. Wyatt, British mathematician
Lynn Wyatt (born 1935), American socialite

M
Marc Wyatt (born 1977), Welsh lawn bowler
Marcus Wyatt (disambiguation), multiple people
Margaret Wyatt, Australian Antarctic adventurer
Mark Wyatt (disambiguation), multiple people
Mary Wyatt (1789–1871), British botanist
Matthew Wyatt (disambiguation), multiple people
Meyne Wyatt (born 1989), Australian actor

N
Naomi Wyatt, American politician
Neale Wyatt (born 1981), Australian rugby league footballer

O
Oscar Wyatt (born 1924), American businessman

P
Paul Wyatt (1907–1970), American swimmer
Paul Wyatt (footballer) (born 1989), English footballer
Petronella Wyatt (born 1968), British journalist
Philip Wyatt (1785–1835), English architect 
Philip J. Wyatt, American scientist

R
Rachel Wyatt (born 1929), English-Canadian dramatist
Ralph Wyatt (1917–1990), American baseball player
Ray Wyatt, American politician
Reg Wyatt (1932–2007), English footballer
Reggie Wyatt (born 1990), American hurdler
Richard Wyatt (disambiguation), multiple people
Robert Wyatt (disambiguation), multiple people
Ron Wyatt (1933–1999), American archaeologist
Rupert Wyatt (born 1972), English screenwriter
Russ Wyatt, Canadian politician
Ryan Wyatt (born 1986), American gaming executive

S
Sally Wyatt (born 1959), Canadian researcher
Samuel Wyatt (1737–1807), British architect
Sarah Wyatt (born 1958), American biologist
Scott Wyatt (disambiguation), multiple people
Sharon Wyatt (born 1953), American actress
Stan Wyatt (1894–1964), Australian politician
Stephen Wyatt (born 1948), British writer
Stephen Wyatt (weightlifter) (born 1950), Australian weightlifter
Steve Wyatt (born 1971), English cricketer

T
Terry Wyatt (born 1957), English professor
Tessa Wyatt (born 1948), British actress
Thomas Wyatt (disambiguation), multiple people
Tom Wyatt (born 1946), Australian horticulturalist
Trevor Wyatt, British record producer
Tristram Wyatt (born 1956), British biologist

V
Victoria Wyatt (born 1956), American ethnographer

W
Walter Wyatt (1893–1978), American lawyer
Wendell Wyatt (1917–2009), American politician
Will Wyatt (born 1942), British television producer
William Wyatt (disambiguation), multiple people
Willie Wyatt (born 1967), American football player
Wilson W. Wyatt (1905–1996), American politician
Woodrow Wyatt (1918–1997), British politician

Z
Zachary Wyatt (born 1984), American politician

Fictional characters
Amy Wyatt, a character on the soap opera Emmerdale
Leo Wyatt, a character on the television series Charmed

See also
Wyatt (given name), a page for people with the given name "Wyatt"
Wyatt (disambiguation), a disambiguation page for "Wyatt"

References

English-language surnames
Patronymic surnames